Deh Nadam (also Romanized as Deh Nadām; also known as Kalāb-e Nāzīl) is a village in Nazil Rural District, Nukabad District, Khash County, Sistan and Baluchestan Province, Iran. At the 2006 census, its population was 169, in 43 families.

References 

Populated places in Khash County